Saint-Anthème (Auvergnat: Sent Antèma) is a commune in the Puy-de-Dôme department in Auvergne in central France.
The village is crossed by the river Ance, a left tributary of the Loire. Saint-Anthème also presents a touristic interest with a lake and a ski station for winter sports. 
A rich flora and fauna compose the natural park where Saint-Anthème stands.

See also
Communes of the Puy-de-Dôme department

References

Saintantheme